Kris Hasskamp (born April 27, 1951) is an American politician.

Hasskamp was born in Crosby, Minnesota. She went to the College of St. Scholastica and received her associate degree from Brainerd Community College. Hasskamp received her bachelor's degree, in health and physical education, from Bemidji State University. Hasskamp was an administrator and educator. Hasskamp served in the Minnesota House of Representatives from 1989 to 2001 and was a Democrat.

References

1951 births
Living people
People from Crosby, Minnesota
College of St. Scholastica alumni
Bemidji State University alumni
Women state legislators in Minnesota
Democratic Party members of the Minnesota House of Representatives
21st-century American women